Bhawani Shankar Chowdhry (born 1 January 1959; Kantio, Sindh) is a Pakistani ICT Professional and an electronics engineer. He is the Distinguished National Professor, Meritorious Professor, Emeritus Professor and former Dean Faculty of Electrical, Electronics and Computer Engineering at the Mehran University of Engineering and Technology Jamashoro, Sindh, Pakistan.

Education
Born in Pakistan, Chowdhry earned a B.E. in electronic engineering with First Class Honours from Mehran University of Engineering and Technology, Jamshoro (MUET) in 1983. He was simultaneously appointed as a lecturer in electronics engineering program in MUET. In 1984, he was awarded Merit Scholarship by Ministry of Science and Technology of Government of Pakistan to gain PhD from University of Southampton United Kingdom.

Publications
In 2007–08 he completed a one-year Postdoctoral Fellowship sponsored by HEC from the School of Electronics and Computer Science, University of Southampton, United Kingdom UK. His research work in the area of Wireless Sensor Networks resulted in a number of publications and is one of the editors of the book "Wireless Networks, Information Processing and Systems", CCIS 20, published by Springer-Verlag, Germany.

Fellowships
He is guest Associate Editor of International Journal of Wireless Personal communication published by Springer Germany. Upon return from the UK in 2008, after completion of Postdoctoral Fellowship, he was appointed as Director, Institute of Information and Communication Technologies (IICT). He was selected as MUET Lead person for Erasmus Mundus external cooperation Window Project: Mobility of Life at Alborg University Denmark. He also attended Erasmus Fellowship under strongTies program at University of Limerick Ireland in 2013. He is also the member of Executive Committee member of HiSHA (Hyderbaad Information & Software Association)

Honours and awards
 On 14 August 2022, President of the Islamic Republic of Pakistan has conferred Bhawani Shankar Chowdhry with the nation's civilian honor, Sitara-i-Imtiaz to recognize his monumental services to the country's public and education sector.
 Recipient of Millennium Gold  Medal, XIIth Star Awards South Asia Publication, 17 May 2002.

Book publications

Following is a list of books authored/coauthored or edited by him. ISBN numbers mentioned for further information.

 C/C++ for Electronics & Telecommunication Engineers, Published by Mehran Infotech Consultants, Hyderabad, Pakistan, June 2002, 330 pages: .
 The Art of Learning C & MS-Access, Published by Mehran Infotech Consultants, Hyderabad, Pakistan, September 2002, 340 pages
 Programming with C & Building Database with Access, Published by Mehran Infotech Consultants, Hyderabad, Pakistan April 2003, 76 pages. .
 Digital Electronics & Microprocessor Technology, Published by Mehran Infotech Consultants, Hyderabad, Pakistan June 2003, 244 pages. 
 Telecommunication Technology, Published by Mehran Infotech Consultants, Hyderabad, Pakistan June 2003, 198 pages. 
 Microprocessors & Interfacing Techniques, Published by Mehran Infotech Consultants, Hyderabad, Pakistan Jan 2005, 140 pages. .
 A Practical Book of Amplifiers & Oscillators, Published by Mehran Infotech Consultants, Hyderabad, Pakistan Dec. 2005, 
 A Practical Book on Introduction to Computing, by Mehran Infotech Consultants, Hyderabad, Pakistan, January 2006.
 Infotech Insider, by Mehran Infotech Consultants, Pakistan, May 2006, .
 A Practical Book of Electromagnetic Waves and Radiating System, by Mehran Infotech Consultants, Hyderabad, Pakistan, March 2007.
 A Practical Book of Digital Electronics, Published by Mehran InfoTech Consultants, Hyderabad, Pakistan, Jan 2008, 
 "Wireless Networks, Information Processing and Systems", CCIS 20, published by Springer Verlag, Germany.
 Career Roadmap Guide for Engineers, recently published, .
 "Emerging Trends and Applications in Information Communication Technologies", CCIS 281 published by Springer Verlag, Germany (Main Editor). 
 "Wireless Sensor Networks for Developing Countries", CCIS 366 published by Springer Verlag, Germany (Main Editor). .
 "The First Book of Electronics Workshop: Can’t Beat A Practical Approach! River Publishers, Denmark. .
 "Communication Technologies, Information Security and Sustainable Development", CCIS 414 published by Springer Verlag, Germany (Main Editor)

See also
 Mehran University of Engineering and Technology

References

1959 births
Pakistani Hindus
Pakistani science writers
Pakistani technology writers
Living people
Pakistani electronics engineers
Pakistani computer scientists
Alumni of the University of Southampton
Sindhi people
Mehran University of Engineering & Technology alumni
Academic staff of Mehran University of Engineering & Technology